Alistair Brown (born 12 December 1985 in Irvine, North Ayrshire) is a retired Scottish football goalkeeper.

Brown has previously played for Hibernian, Cowdenbeath, Raith Rovers, Stenhousemuir, Forfar Athletic, Ayr United and Hurlford United.

Career
Brown started his career at Hibernian, where he was frequently selected as the substitute goalkeeper, but rarely played. In fact, he only played in part of one Scottish Premier League match, coming on as a substitute for Simon Brown in a 2–1 win against Dunfermline on 18 December 2004. He didn't play in another first team match for Hibernian, despite being contracted with the club until 2008.

He spent most of the rest of his time with the club out on loan at various Scottish Football League clubs, including Ayr United and Raith Rovers. Brown initially joined Stenhousemuir on loan in October 2007. He then returned to Ochilview on loan in February 2008, having returned to Hibernian the previous month.

Brown signed for Forfar Athletic in the summer of 2008 on a free transfer. During his first season at Station Park, Brown played in a Scottish Cup tie against Rangers, where he came up against childhood contemporary Kris Boyd. Brown left Forfar at the end of the 2009–10 season, when he signed a one-year deal with Stenhousemuir.

Brown signed for Ayr United during the 2012 summer transfer window. He left Ayr United after the 2012–13 season and moved to junior club Hurlford United.

He has said to have retired in 2019.

References

External links 

1985 births
Living people
Footballers from Irvine, North Ayrshire
Scottish footballers
Association football goalkeepers
Hibernian F.C. players
Cowdenbeath F.C. players
Raith Rovers F.C. players
Ayr United F.C. players
Stenhousemuir F.C. players
Forfar Athletic F.C. players
Scottish Premier League players
Scottish Football League players
Hurlford United F.C. players